Juan José Díaz Infante Núñez (b. Mexico City, June 24, 1936 - Mexico City, June 12, 2012) was a Mexican architect and industrial designer.

His architectural works included urban planning projects, malls, bus stations, hotels, cinemas, sports facilities, schools, public, industrial and administration buildings, particularly in Mexico, but also in other countries.

Díaz Infante was scientific adviser of the council of Mexico City architects ( CAM) and of the Sociedad de Arquitectos de México (SAM). As industrial designer he was scientific adviser of the Asociación de Industriales del Plástico (ANIPAC), observer in the Instituto Mexicano del Plástico Industrial, as well as member of the Society of Plastics Engineers, Pittsburgh.

Díaz Infante taught design and visual education at the Universidad Iberoamericana (UIA), at the Universidad Nacional Autónoma de México (UNAM) and at the Universidad Anáhuac (UA). He also lectured at other institutions and universities. He was founding master at the Universidad La Salle, and was founder and first director of the school of architecture of the Universidad Anáhuac. Furthermore, he was founding member of the Academia Mexicana de Arquitectura and of the association of industrial designers.

He was official Mexican representative at the UIA young architects' meeting at the Cultural Olympiad during the 1968 Summer Olympics.

Group and single exhibitions 
 1964: Mexican pavilion, 1964 New York World's Fair
 1966:
 Arquitectura de Vanguardia en México, Palacio de Bellas Artes, Mexico City
 Arquitectura Actual en América Madrid, Spanien
 1967: Del Dolmen a la Kalikosmia, Museo de Arte Moderno, Mexico City
 1969: El objeto Cotidiano, Museo de Arte Moderno, Mexico City, 1969
 1970:
 Diseño Actual en México, Museo de Arte Moderno, Mexico City
 Casa Prefrabricada, Instituto Politécnico Nacional, Mexico City
 Home Builders, Washington, D.C.

External links 
 Juan José Díaz Infante Núñez
 Bilder der Werke von Juan José Díaz Infante at ''praella.com

References

Mexican architects
Mexican industrial designers
Academic staff of the National Autonomous University of Mexico
Academic staff of Universidad Iberoamericana
Academic staff of Universidad Anáhuac México
People from Mexico City
1936 births
2012 deaths